Flag bearers carry the national flag of their country at the opening ceremony of the Olympic Games. Soviet officials expected the flag bearer to show an example of an attractive, physically strong person and a distinguished athlete. He was expected to carry the flag through the Olympic ceremony in one hand unsupported by a harness. Hence the Soviet flag bearers at the opening ceremony of the Summer Olympics were selected from among heavyweight weightlifters or wrestlers, who did not have to compete the next day.

Soviet officials also expected the flag bearer to win a gold medal at the given Olympics. This resulted in absurd situations at the 1952 and 1956 Summer Olympics, when the selected flag bearers, Yakov Kutsenko and Aleksey Medvedev respectively, were not allowed to compete because the officials did not believe they would win a gold medal. Both were top-level heavyweight weightlifters. Kutsenko placed second at the 1950 World Championships and Medvedev won the world title in 1956 and 1957.

Below is a list of flag bearers who have represented the Soviet Union at the Olympics.

See also
Soviet Union at the Olympics

References

Soviet Union at the Olympics
Soviet Union
Olympic flagbearers